Björn Danielsson (born August 14, 1977) is a retired Swedish professional ice hockey player currently assistant coach in IF Sundsvall Hockey team in the Swedish HockeyAllsvenskan league.

References

External links 
 

1977 births
Swedish ice hockey centres
AIK IF players
Brynäs IF players
Living people
Ice hockey people from Stockholm